Slavko Kolar (1 December 1891 - 15 September 1963) was a Yugoslav writer.

Selected works
 Nasmijane pripovijesti (1917)
 Ili jesmo - ili nismo (1933)
 Mi smo za pravicu (1936)
 Svoga tijela gospodar (1942)
 Natrag u naftalin (1946)
 Glavno da je kapa na glavi (1956)

References

External links 

1891 births
1963 deaths
Yugoslav writers
People from Garešnica
Yugoslav screenwriters